Dennis C. Stewart (born 12 May 1960) is a retired male judoka from Great Britain, who competed at the 1988 Summer Olympics in Seoul, South Korea.

Judo career
Stewart became a four times champion of Great Britain, winning the light-heavyweight division at the British Judo Championships in 1980, 1981, 1982 and 1983. In 1986, he won the bronze medal in the 95kg weight category at the judo demonstration sport event as part of the 1986 Commonwealth Games.

In 1988, he was selected to represent Great Britain at the 1988 Olympic Games. Competing in the men's half-heavyweight (– 95 kg) division, he won a bronze medal after being defeated in the semi-finals by Brazil's eventual gold medalist Aurélio Miguel.

Post retirement
After retiring from competition, he established a judo club, and coaches at the GB Judo Centre of Excellence, where he coaches, among others, his sons Max Stewart and Elliot Stewart.

References

External links
 
 
 

1960 births
Living people
British male judoka
Olympic judoka of Great Britain
Olympic bronze medallists for Great Britain
Olympic medalists in judo
Judoka at the 1988 Summer Olympics
Medalists at the 1988 Summer Olympics
Judoka trainers
English sports coaches